The 2014 Spanish motorcycle Grand Prix was the fourth round of the 2014 MotoGP season. It was held at the Circuito de Jerez in Jerez de la Frontera on 4 May 2014.

Classification

MotoGP

Moto2

Moto3

Championship standings after the race (MotoGP)
Below are the standings for the top five riders and constructors after round four has concluded.

Riders' Championship standings

Constructors' Championship standings

 Note: Only the top five positions are included for both sets of standings.

References

Spanish motorcycle Grand Prix
Spanish
Motorcycle Grand Prix
Spanish motorcycle Grand Prix